The Isle of Wight Festival 2019 was the eighteenth edition of the revived Isle of Wight Festival, which took place at Seaclose Park in Newport, on the Isle of Wight. It was held on 13 to 16 June 2019. Tickets were released on Friday January 25, 2019 at 9am.

Highlights 

 This iteration of the event sported a "Summer of ‘69 – Peace and Love" theme, celebrating the 50th anniversary of the legendary Isle of Wight Festival 1969. Related activities include a Bob Dylan tribute band opening the festival, a 60's costume contest, and Beatles-themed virtual reality experience in partnership with The Beatles Story museum. Festival organiser John Giddings also asked performers to play a Bob Dylan song, which George Ezra did, covering "Don’t Think Twice It’s Alright".
 Lily Allen held a minute of silence during her Friday set as a tribute to the victims of the Grenfell Tower incident, which happened exactly 2 years earlier. Some audience members broke the silence, and were called out by the singer before resuming her act.
 Cage the Elephant and Sam Fender were both originally scheduled to play on Saturday 15th, but had to cancel their appearance due to injury and illness, respectively. They were replaced on June 12 by Friendly Fires and Yungblud.
 Jess Glynne had been due to perform at the festival on Sunday evening, however she received a lifetime ban from the festival after cancelling her set with only 10 minutes warning. Instead, Richard Ashcroft performed earlier, and Biffy Clyro performed a longer set. The singer confessed that her reason for cancelling was after a heavy night ("It is true that I went out and celebrated the end of the Spice World tour.").

Line-up

Main Stage

Friday 

 Noel Gallagher's High Flying Birds
 Courteeners
 Lily Allen
 James
 Gerry Cinnamon
 Creeper
 DMA's
 Wild Front

Saturday 

 George Ezra
 Fatboy Slim
 Bastille
 Anne-Marie
 Rick Astley
 Sundara Karma
 KT Tunstall
 Andrew Roachford
 Electric Enemy

Sunday 

 Biffy Clyro
 Richard Ashcroft
 Madness
 Sigrid
 Tom Walker
 Björn Again
 Ferris & Sylvester
 Sub Pacific

Big Top

Thursday 

 Wet Wet Wet
 Heather Small
 James Walsh
 Simply Dylan

Friday 

 Haçienda Classical
 Jax Jones
 Sigala
 Freya Ridings
 Sea Girls
 Bang Bang Romeo

Saturday 

 Garbage
 Friendly Fires
 Miles Kane
 Yungblud
 Picture This
 Palaye Royale
 Billy Lockett
 The Snuts

Sunday 

 Keane
 Dermot Kennedy
 The Coral
 Idles
 Starsailor
 Ward Thomas
 Feet
 Fatherson
 Lauran Hibberd

Other areas

Platform One Stage 
The Platform One Stage is programmed and run by the Platform One College of Music. Isle of Wight emerging musicians that were shortlisted for the Wight Noize event on May 11 were granted a spot in the stage's lineup. One such band was selected to open the last day of the festival, Sub Pacific.

Hosted in the Electro Ladyland area of the festival, it was also home to silent disco parties once the mainstage acts finished playing. The organisers also set up a silent karaoke activity, in partnership with a Londonian karaoke venue and a karaoke software company.

This Feeling w/ Pirate Studios + Scotts Stage 
The This Feeling stage was home to 47 upcoming artists during the whole week-end, in collaboration with the This Feeling music promoter. This stage has also appeared on Tramlines and Truck Festivals in 2019.

Strongbow Yard 
The Strongbow Yard was a venue featuring DJ sets, pyrotechnical shows and "Refreshing People Live", a piano duo playing requests from the audience. The whole yard was centered around a ten-metre Strongbow archer statue. It was its first 2019 appearance, before showing up later at Kendal Calling and Victorious festivals.

References

External links 

 Isle of Wight Festival Official Website (2019-06-20 archive)

2019
2019 in British music
2019 in England
21st century on the Isle of Wight